is a Japanese footballer of Senegalese descent currently playing as a forward for FC Osaka.

Career

Youth career
Ndao studied and played football as his extra-curricular activity, with Sapporo Sosei High School and Niigata University of Health and Welfare.

Club career
On 13 December 2022, Ndao joined J3 newly promoted team FC Osaka after two years at Yokohama F. Marinos.

Personal life
Ndao was born in Hokkaido, Japan. He is Senegalese descent through senegalese father and Japanese mother.

Career statistics

Club
.

Notes

References

External links

1999 births
Living people
Association football people from Hokkaido
Niigata University of Health and Welfare alumni
Japanese footballers
Senegalese footballers
Japanese people of Senegalese descent
Association football forwards
J1 League players
J2 League players
J3 League players
Japan Football League players
Yokohama F. Marinos players
FC Machida Zelvia players
FC Osaka players
FC Maruyasu Okazaki players